The Freshwater Pro 2019 was the eighth event of the Men's Championship Tour in the 2019 World Surf League. It took place from 19 to 21 September at the Surf Ranch in Lemoore, California, and was contested by 36 surfers.

In the final, Brazil's Gabriel Medina scored 18.86 to win the 14th Championship Tour event of his career, ahead of fellow Brazilian Filipe Toledo.

References

External links

 World Surf League

Freshwater Pro
2019 World Surf League
2019 in sports in California
September 2019 sports events in the United States